The Pilanesberg National Park is located north of Rustenburg in the North West Province of South Africa. The park borders on the Sun City entertainment complex. It is currently administered by the North West Parks and Tourism Board.

The Pilanesberg is named for chief Pilane of the Kgafêla people, who ruled from Bogopane, Mmamodimokwana and eventually Mmasebudule during the 1800s. The 'Pilanesberg Alkaline Ring Complex' is the park's primary geological feature. This vast circular feature is geologically ancient, being the ring dikes that fed a completely eroded caldera created by volcanic eruptions some 1,200 million years ago. It is one of the largest volcanic complexes of its type in the world, the rare rock types and formations make it a unique geological feature, and a number of rare minerals occur in the park.

Scattered throughout the park are various sites that are assigned to the Iron and Stone Ages and illustrate the presence of man during those early periods.

The park
 
Although most of the 188 kilometres of track is not surfaced, it is all maintained in good condition. The three main tarred roads are named Kgabo, Kubu and Tshwane. There are several camps, including Bakgatla and Manyane, serving the park from the perimeter. Several lodges are situated in the interior of the park. For day visitors, there are several stops on the inside where there are bars and gift shops. Near the centre of the park, there is an artificially constructed lake, the Mankwe Dam. There is one perennial river and a number of freshwater and saline springs that form smaller dams with animal hides nearby. Near the centre is Thabayadiotso, which means "the Proud Mountain".

Flora and fauna

Plants
The scenic terrain lies in the transition zone between Kalahari and Lowveld, and both types of vegetation are found here. As a result of the park being in a transition zone, there are overlaps in mammals, birds, and vegetation. Today, Pilanesberg National Park accommodates almost every large mammal of southern Africa.

Distinct vegetation communities can be found in the Pilanesberg. The broad vegetation communities present in the Park have been described as follows:

 North-facing hill savanna – these slopes receive more sunlight and are therefore drier than the south-facing slopes. The dominant tree is the red bushwillow.
 South-facing hill savanna – this area is characterized by hook thorn, wild pear and buffalo thorn. The absence of elephants from the system for over 140 years allowed the mountain cabbage tree to spread through the Pilanesberg. These trees and aloes are sought after by elephants and are now restricted to the highest hills.
 Pediment savanna – the pediments contain a subterranean layer of ferricrete, an accumulation of hard sheets of iron oxides. This prevents tree growth and maintains open grasslands.
 Valley savanna – this savanna is dominated by sweet thorn, umbrella thorn, karree, leadwood, tamboti and buffalo-thorn trees.
 Valley thicket – thickets of sweet thorn and black thorn occur on brack soils in the valleys.
 Rock outcrop thicket – outcrops of red syenite have weathered into a jumble of red-brown boulders that support a thicket dominated by lavender fever-berry, large-leaved fig, and red balloon tree.

Mammals

The park has a rich array of southern African wildlife including the Big Five, the five most dangerous game animals in Africa. Most of the large animal species of southern Africa live in the Pilanesberg National Park today, including lions, elephants, black rhinos, white rhinos, Cape buffaloes, leopards, cheetahs, zebras, giraffes, hippos and crocodiles. The Cape wild dog (Lycaon pictus pictus) was extirpated from the park by poachers, but subsequent reintroduction efforts were successful. The Pilanesberg is not in a location which the Big Five animals would naturally inhabit, however they have been brought into the 550 square kilometres of African bushland. The reserve is also home to brown hyenas.

As of December 2010 the total count of large mammals was approximately 10,000, including:

 50 lions
 30 leopards
 12 cheetahs
 220 elephants
 black rhinoceros
 white rhinoceros
 5 sable antelopes
 220 African buffaloes
 600 kudus
 1,700 zebras
 3,000 impalas
 170 South African giraffes
 1 or 2 spotted hyena
 brown hyenas

Other cats can be found, such as caracals. Indigenous southern African mammals that are not present are bontebok, blesbuck, nyala and roan antelope.

Birdlife
The diversity of birdlife is excellent with over 360 species having been recorded. Though some are migrants, most others are permanent inhabitants. Their food sources vary with some eating carrion or live prey, others eat seeds, fruit or tiny water organisms.

There is a self-guided trail in the Walking Area at the Manyane Complex in the east, which offers environmental education whilst game viewing and bird watching on foot. Also at Manyane, there is a walk-in aviary with over 80 species of indigenous birds.

History

Early inhabitants of the Pilanesberg
Humans have been in the Pilanesberg area since the Middle Stone Age. Many artefacts from this period can be found throughout the Park. Hunter-gatherers roamed the area well before the first Setswana-speaking people settled as cattle and grain farmers.

Iron Age

During the later Iron Age period, the ancestors of the Batswana and Basotho people occupied the area. They were cattle farmers and pastoralists who also worked copper and iron.

Tswana period
Major Tswana towns were established during the late 18th century. Most of these towns were destroyed during the Difaqane wars that raged in the Pilanesberg/Magaliesberg region in the late 1820s, when Mzilikazi occupied the region. The towns were destroyed and the Ndebele ruled over the area during the period.

Pre 1970s
In the late nineteenth century, Pilanesberg served as a sanctuary to Mzilikazi’s rebel Zulu warriors who passed through the area as they fled the wrath of the Zulu king, Shaka. A mission station was established more or less in the northwestern part of the park, on the farm Driefontein, which lay wedged between a large section of land traditionally owned by the Bakgatla-ba-Kgafela (commonly known as the Bakgatla) tribe. This land constitutes much of the northern region of today's Pilanesberg reserve.

What is now the southern section of the Pilanesberg reserve was originally a set of farms which were sold to and registered in the names of a number of Boer farmers by the Transvaal government in the 1860s. These farmers were responsible for building the Houwater dam - now known as the Mankwe dam - which is the Pilanesberg's largest standing water reservoir. During the 1960s, these farms were re-purchased by the South African government, which, under Apartheid policies, re-settled the Bakubung tribe from nearby Ventersdorp onto the farms Wydhoek, Koedoesfontein, and Ledig. These farms, situated on and in the southern part of the Pilanesberg reserve adjacent to Sun City, were subsequently delivered to Bophuthatswana, a large northwestern bantustan, for administration and control. As a result, the only remaining private property inside the Pilanesberg reserve amounts to 3 small sections (likely graveyards, approximately 3 hectares each in size) as well as a farm (approximately 608 hectares) registered in the name of Catherina Clark, a daughter of Jan Smuts.

1970s
Following Bophuthatswana's independence from South Africa in 1977, then-president Lucas Mangope decided to re-introduce wildlife and convert the Pilanesberg into a game reserve. A planning committee was established to develop the game reserve, which was to include the whole of the Pilanesberg mountains. However, to facilitate this new designation, people residing in the area had to be re-settled. Following that, all buildings in the area, including the mission church on Driefontein but excluding the magistrate court building, were demolished. (The magistrate court building, a lovely Cape Dutch style structure, burned down in an accidental blaze in the 1980s. It was subsequently partially rebuilt. A new building, the Pilanesberg Centre, was also erected near where the court used to stand.) Additionally, all non-native flora were razed from the region in an attempt to ensure only authentic native plant life would exist in the park.

Following negotiations with the Bophuthatswana government, the Bakgatla tribe, under Chief Tsidimane Pilane, agreed to the inclusion of the mountainous region of their property within the Pilanesberg reserve. The 60 families of the Bakgatla tribe farming and living near the mission station at Driefontein were re-settled under an agreement with the tribal authority. They were moved to a newly planned town on the farm Sandfontein, to the east of the Pilanesberg National Park.

The Bophuthatswana administration also negotiated with the Bakubung tribe to purchase their land within the southern region of the park. The tribe was offered land on adjacent farms Zandrivierspoort, Palmietfontein, and Mahobieskraal, in exchange for portions of the farms Ledig, Koedoesfontein, and Wydhoek, on a hectare-for-hectare basis. As the agricultural value of the new land on offer exceeded that of the old, the Bakubung eventually accepted the offer. (Around the same time, Sun International obtained a ninety-nine-year leasehold over the adjacent farm Doornhoek and built the Sun City complex, which abuts the Pilanesberg reserve, along the common boundary with the farm Ledig.)

It was at this point that work began on Operation Genesis, which involved the reintroduction of long-vanished species after completion of approximately 100  km of fencing around the reserve's perimeter. This reintroduction was still ongoing when the Pilanesberg National Park, was opened in the early 1980s by President Mangope with Chief Pilane present.

1980s

6000 animals were resettled into the park over the course of the early 1980s with Operation Genesis, which was featured on a two-part episode on Wild Kingdom in 1981. It was the largest game resettlement program in the history of the country. The 6000 animals were released into the quarantine area of 10 km2 in groups and after a few weeks the fences were dropped. As the purpose of the park was a feeder for other parks no lions or cheetahs were brought in. However, leopards were naturally present as were brown hyena and mountain reedbuck. Currently, Pilanesberg has the highest concentration of hyena of any game park in the world. Also brought in was a family of elephants. As no mature bulls were brought in as they were too large, the young bulls caused a bit of havoc and killed 17 rhinoceroses. The reason for this was there was no parental care and the young bulls came into adolescence at too young an age. However, by this time the transport techniques had improved so 6 older bulls were brought in from the Kruger. This suppressed the adolescence problem. The young culprits were all shot.

The creation of the Pilanesberg National Park is considered one of the most ambitious programs of its kind to be undertaken anywhere in the world. Operation Genesis is still the largest game translocation undertaken in the world, and as a result, the park now has in excess of 10,000 animals.

1990s
In 1990 when Nelson Mandela was released, tourism in South Africa boomed. Camps and lodges were built on the park's perimeter and it became a tourist destination. In response to this, in 1993, the focus was changed from game animals to predators. Lions from the Etosha National Park in Namibia were relocated to this park despite serious concerns from the surrounding communities. Since then, the lions' numbers have been increasing in the park. A similar attempt with cheetahs from Namibia was not equally successful.

Following the attempted forceful reoccupation of Bophuthatswana by various factions in 1994, President Mangope was deposed and Bophuthatswana was reincorporated within the Republic of South Africa, placing the entire Pilanesberg National Park officially within South Africa's borders.

2000s

The size of the park was increased from 552 to 572  km2 in May 2004 as part of a workable 10-year plan to establish a corridor between Pilanesberg and Madikwe Game Reserve. The 20  km2 that was added on the northwestern was the first bit from Pilanesberg's side. On the Madikwe's side, there have already been several additions towards the southeast. There are also several private owners dropping fences from the middle moving towards Pilanesberg and Madikwe. Property, that was selling for R30,000/km2 2 years ago, is now selling for R500,000/km2. Plans are being concluded to add a large piece of land to the park in the next two years. A recent poll conducted by the South African Tourism Board found that the Pilanesberg has jumped to the number 1 ranking on the list of most popular public game reserves in South Africa. This comes after many years of trailing the Kruger National Park. It is thought that Pilanesberg's close proximity to Johannesburg coupled with the fact that it is malaria-free has led to its new-found popularity.

Gallery

See also
 Pilanesberg International Airport
 Protected areas of South Africa
 Doornkop Reserve

References

External links 

 The official website for Parks North West

North West Provincial Parks
Landforms of North West (South African province)
Moses Kotane Local Municipality
Volcanoes of South Africa